The Webb Tract is an island in the Sacramento–San Joaquin River Delta. It is part of Contra Costa County, California, and managed by Reclamation District 2026.

References

Islands of Contra Costa County, California
Islands of the Sacramento–San Joaquin River Delta
Islands of Northern California